= Twenty20 Stock Photos =

Twenty20
- Formerly: Instacanvas
- Company type: Private
- Industry: Stock photography
- Founded: February 1, 2014 in Marina Del Rey, California, US
- Founders: Matt Munson, Todd Emaus, Kevin Fremon
- Defunct: July 31, 2022
- Headquarters: 1038 Princeton, Marina Del Rey, California, U.S.
- Website: www.twenty20.com

Twenty20 was a crowd-sourced stock photography marketplace with a library of over 45 million royalty-free stock photos.

== History ==
=== Start-up ===
The company was initially founded in April 2013 as Instacanvas, a service to print Instagram photographs on canvas. In October 2013, it rebranded itself as Twenty20, changing its focus to become a crowdsourced stock photography marketplace for social media advertising campaigns.

Along with Series A round funding, Twenty20 announced in February 2015 that it had over 45 million photographs. The service ended its beta test in March 2015.

=== Operation ===
The company crowdsourced photographs from amateur and professional stock photographers.

Users uploaded photographs using an app. Those photos were then highlighted in two ways. First, other users could nominate the photo for inclusion in Twenty20’s "Signature Collection". Second, users could enter mini, themed contests, voted on by other users.

Photographs that were added to the Signature Collection and contest winners were then featured on the app's homepage, further boosting them.

The company focused on authenticity, which they cited as desirable to millennials. ABC News described the most popular images as those that "show[ed] healthy lifestyles, modern workplaces and scenes from everyday life".

Twenty20 offered both à la carte and subscription-based access to advertisers. Joining was free for photographers, who shared revenue with Twenty20, with Twenty20 paying higher rates compared with many other stock photo companies.

=== Purchase and closure ===
Purchased was by Envato Elements in 2019, which had its own smaller stock offering. Envato said it had plans to expand the service. A little over a year later, however, Envato announced that it was shutting down the app

Twenty20 was discontinued by July 31, 2022. Envato chose not to carry over the curated Signature Collection into its offering. A very small percentage of Twenty20's photographers were invited to continue with Envato.
